Tata is a city in central Morocco with a population of 18.611 according to the country's 2014 census. It is the largest city in Tata Province. 

It is situated on a desert plain of the Sahara Desert, southeast of Agadir and Taroudant, close to the Algerian border and the mountain range Anti-Atlas located at the foot of The Bani mountain ranges a lower-range along the southern side of the Anti-Atlas. Tourists use the town as a base for excursions in the area. Tata lies on the N12 highway between to the north-east of the regional capital Guelmim and to the south of the neighboring region of Drâa-Tafilalet. Due to the remoteness of the area there is no border crossing with Algeria.

References 

Populated places in Tata Province
Tata, Morocco